Miss Teen USA 2020 was the 38th Miss Teen USA pageant. Originally scheduled to be held in spring 2020, the competition was postponed indefinitely due to the COVID-19 pandemic. It was later rescheduled for November 7, 2020 at the Exhibition Centre and the Soundstage at Graceland in Memphis, Tennessee. Kaliegh Garris of Connecticut crowned Ki'ilani Arruda of Hawaii as her successor at the end of the event. The competition was hosted by Allie LaForce and Miss USA 2019 Cheslie Kryst. 

The competition marked the first year that a new crown made by luxury jeweler Mouawad was used at Miss Teen USA, effectively retiring the Mikimoto Crown.

For a third consecutive year, the competition was held concurrently alongside the Miss USA competition. This was the last Miss Teen USA to be organized by Miss Universe Organization before being split into its separate organization beginning in Miss Teen USA 2021.

Background

Location
On August 30, 2020, Graceland announced on their schedule that the competition would be held on November 7 on their premises in Memphis, Tennessee. The MUO later confirmed that the competition will be hosted at Graceland the following day.

This was the first time the competition has been hosted in Tennessee since Miss Teen USA 1984 was also held in Memphis.

Hosts 
On October 22, it was announced that the competition would be hosted by Allie LaForce and Cheslie Kryst. LaForce formerly was crowned Miss Teen USA 2005, and has worked as a sports reporter for Fox and Turner Sports, while Kryst was crowned Miss USA 2019 and serves as a correspondent for Extra.

Selection of contestants
51 delegates from the 50 states and the District of Columbia are selected in state pageants which began in September 2019 and ended in February 2020.

Results

Order of Announcements

Top 16

 

 
Top 5

Pageant

Preliminary round
Prior to the final competition, the delegates competed the preliminary competition, which the judges and a presentation show where they competed in swim wear and evening gown. It was held on November 6 at Graceland Exhibition Center and the Soundstage in Memphis and hosted by Kryst and Garris.

Broadcasting
The pageant is livestreamed on the Miss Universe Organization's social media channels and on PlayStation 4 consoles as a live event on the U.S. PlayStation Store, while an encore presentation of the pageant is available via catch-up from November 12–15, which is also viewable in 4K and on PlayStation 5 consoles. It is also viewable on Xbox One and Xbox Series X/S consoles via Facebook Watch.

It was also the final pageant to be streamed on PlayStation Network due to the discontinuation of video content on the PlayStation Store in 2021.

Judges
Danielle Doty Fitzgerald – Miss Teen USA 2011 from Texas
Sara Echeagaray – social media personality and TikToker 
Nia Franklin – Miss America 2019 from New York
K. Lee Graham – Miss Teen USA 2014 from South Carolina
Iman Oubou – scientist, entrepreneur, and medical missionary

Contestants 
State or district titleholders were:

Notes

References

External links

 Miss Teen USA official website

2020
Beauty pageants in the United States
2020 beauty pageants
November 2020 events in the United States
2020 in Tennessee
Events postponed due to the COVID-19 pandemic